Fakrul Alam (born 20 July 1951) is a Bangladeshi academic, writer, and translator. He writes on literary matters and postcolonial issues and translated works of Jibanananda Das and Rabindranath Tagore into English. He is the recipient of Bangla Academy Literary Award (2012) in translation literature and SAARC Literary Award (2012).

Early life and education
Alam grew up in Ramkrishna Mission Road, Dhaka. He began his schooling at Little Jewels Kindergarten and later attended St. Joseph's School and spent his college days in Notre Dame College. He completed BA and MA in English at the University of Dhaka, earned a second master's degree from Simon Fraser University and achieved his PhD degree from the University of British Columbia, Vancouver. His PhD dissertation was on works of Daniel Defoe.

Academic career
Alam became a faculty member at the Department of English of the University of Dhaka after the liberation war of Bangladesh. As of today, he taught at several universities around the globe, including Clemson University, USA as a Fulbright Scholar, and Jadavpur University, India as a visiting associate professor.
Besides academic responsibilities, he was also the Director of the Advanced Studies in the Humanities of the University of Dhaka from 1993 to 1996, and Adviser of the Dhaka University Central Library from 2002 to 2003. He is currently a member of the Education Policy Implementation Committee constituted by the Government of Bangladesh. He serves as an advisor at the Department of English of East West University.

Works
Alam's first book was Daniel Defoe: Colonial Propagandist. He writes in a vibrant style with logical argumentation on literary matters that range from colonial to post-colonial literature. For him, reading and writing are a living experience. He received widespread recognition as one of the best translators and foremost authorities of Jibanananda Das and Rabindranath Tagore. Appreciating Alam's translation of Jibanananda Das, Syed Manzoorul Islam said "the sights and sounds of Bengal's landscape, its crowded botany and its constantly shifting lights and shadows find their way into Alam's translation". In 2011 he edited The Essential Tagore in collaboration with Radha Chakravarty for Visva-Bharati University, India and Harvard University Press, USA. Below is an excerpt of Alam's translation of "Amar Shonar Bangla" (My Bengal of Gold) by R.Tagore from The Essential Tagore:

"O mother, when I lay myself down at your feet;Bless me with the dust that they tread, for they will bejewel me.O mother dear, what little I have I will lay at your feet,How fulfilling to stop adorning myself with foreign purchases,To know that even the rope you provide for a noose can be my adornment!" (331)

Publications
 The Unfinished Memoirs (translation of Sheikh Mujibur Rahman's unfinished autobiography; 2012)
 The Essential Tagore (2011)
 Rabindranath Tagore and National Identity Formation in Bangladesh: Essays and Reviews (2013)
 Imperial Entanglements and Literature in English (2007)
 Dictionary of Literary Biography: South Asian Writers in English (2006)
 Jibananada Das: Selected Poems, Translated with Introduction, Bibliography and Glossary (1999)
 Bharati Mukherjee, Twane's United States Authors Series (1995)
 Daniel Defoe: Colonial Propagandist (1989)
 The Ocean of Sorrow (2016)

References

Further reading
 
 

Living people
1951 births
People from Feni District
University of Dhaka alumni
Academic staff of the University of Dhaka
Bengali–English translators
Bangladeshi translators
Recipients of Bangla Academy Award